Denistone East is a suburb in Northern Sydney, Australia. Denistone East is 16 kilometres north-west of the Sydney central business district in the local government area of the City of Ryde. Denistone and Denistone West are separate suburbs; Denistone East was gazetted as a suburb in its own right on 5 February 1999.

Population
In the 2016 Census, there were 2,250 people in Denistone East. 55.1% of people were born in Australia. The next most common countries of birth were China 15.2% and South Korea 4.7%. 49.1% of people spoke only English at home. Other languages spoken at home included Mandarin 17.4%, Cantonese 9.3% and Korean 5.9%. The most common responses for religion were No Religion 31.3%, Catholic 27.2% and Anglican 9.6%.

Commercial area
Denistone East does not have its own retail area. The closest shopping precinct is Midway Shopping Centre, which lies just outside Denistone East's northeast boundary in the suburb of Ryde.
      
Larger regional shopping centres such as Macquarie Centre and Top Ryde City are located nearby.

Schools

Denistone East Public School was established in 1950, and is a large local primary school with over 800 students from Kindergarten to Grade 6. It was rebuilt in 2005 with completely new administrative, assembly and classroom blocks. Back in 2019 with the help of government funding they got rid of the demountables and build new classrooms for stage 3.

Transport
At present the following routes service Denistone East. All are provided by Busways:
Route 286: Milsons Point via North Ryde, Lane Cove and North Sydney (morning and evening peak hour service) [This service formerly ran to QVB, however the route was changed in October 2015 due to George St road closure for the construction of the light rail]
Route 297: Wynyard via North Ryde and Lane Cove Tunnel (morning and evening peak hour service) [This service formerly ran to QVB, however the route was changed in October 2015 due to George St road closure for the construction of the light rail]
Route 515: Eastwood (via Denistone East/Blaxland Road) to Top Ryde via Ryde Hospital 
Route 518: Meadowbank ferry wharf to Macquarie University via Top Ryde
Route 544: Auburn to Macquarie Centre via Eastwood and Ermington (Mon-Sat Service)

References

External links
 Midway Shopping Centre
  [CC-By-SA]

Suburbs of Sydney
City of Ryde
Denistone, New South Wales